Earl Christopher Dotson (born December 17, 1970) is a former American football offensive tackle in the National Football League (NFL). He was selected in the third round (81st overall) of the 1993 NFL Draft by the Green Bay Packers after playing college football for Texas A&M–Kingsville. He played for the Packers for 10 seasons. He started in Super Bowl XXXI and XXXII.

1970 births
Living people
American football offensive tackles
Green Bay Packers players
Texas A&M–Kingsville Javelinas football players
Tyler Apaches football players
People from Beaumont, Texas
Ed Block Courage Award recipients